Urodacus centralis is a species of scorpion in the Urodacidae family. It has a limited range in central Australia, and was first described in 1977.

Description
The species grows to about 105–115 mm in length. Colouration is variable, often dark reddish-brown, with legs and tail paler yellowish-brown.

References

 

 
centralis
Scorpions of Australia
Endemic fauna of Australia
Fauna of the Northern Territory
Animals described in 1977